MW Tux was a division of Men's Wearhouse clothier that specialized in the renting of tuxedos and formal wear for men. In late 2008, the MW Tux Brand was rolled up into the Men's Wearhouse brand, and ceased being an independent brand.

Men's Wearhouse formalwear business grew via the acquisition of After Hours, a formalwear company.  Originally known as Mitchell's Formalwear and founded in 1946, After Hours was the result of the acquisition by Mitchell's of fellow clothiers Small's and Tuxedo World in the late 1990s, and has since acquired and assimilated several other chains in the United States. After Hours was acquired by May Department Stores in 2001, and became a part of Federated Department Stores following that company's buyout of May in 2005. It operated over 450 stores in 31 states and the District of Columbia.  It was combined with David's Bridal when acquired by May, and during that time coordinated much of its inventory with David's Bridal.

On November 17, 2006, After Hours Formalwear was sold to Men's Wearhouse and David's Bridal was purchased along with sister division Priscilla of Boston by Leonard Green & Partners. The chain operated as MW Tux for a year, before being re-branded again as Men's Wearhouse & Tux.

In September 2008 Men's Wearhouse selected the New York advertising agency DeVito/Verdi to handle its national advertising and marketing communications account. The assignment calls for the agency to provide full-service marketing support and to develop strategic planning, advertising, public relations, market planning, promotions, and P-O-S programs. In addition to the Men's Wearhouse brand, DeVito/Verdi will also handle marketing for the company's other retail brands: K&G, MW Tux, Moores Clothing For Men (Canada), as well as new projects in development.

References

External links
www.menswearhouse.com/webapp/wcs/stores/servlet/Tuxedos_-1_10601_10051_10651_10651_Tuxedos.html Official Website

Clothing retailers of the United States
Clothing companies established in 1946
Retail companies established in 1946
Retail companies disestablished in 2008
Companies based in Houston
1946 establishments in Texas
Clothing rental companies